Greg Reid (born September 8, 1990) is a professional gridiron football cornerback for the Montreal Alouettes of the Canadian Football League (CFL). He led college football in yards per punt return in 2009, and was named defensive MVP of the 2010 Chick-fil-A Bowl.

Career

In high school
After a senior season in which he rushed for over 1,200 yards, scored 18 touchdowns and had nine interceptions, Reid was named the fourth best cornerback in the nation, and the top overall prospect in Georgia. He earned All-American honors from Parade and SuperPrep. The Atlanta Journal-Constitution named him "Georgia Player of the Year" and he was also the class five-A "Georgia Player of the Decade".

Reid was heavily recruited out of high school, earning five star ratings from both Rivals and Scouts, and received scholarship offers from Alabama, Auburn, Florida (he initially chose Florida over FSU during the recruiting process), and Georgia, among others.

College football
Reid played all thirteen games of the 2009 season, intercepting two passes and leading the NCAA in punt return average".

On August 1, 2012, Reid was dismissed from the Florida State Seminoles team for violating team rules. He transferred to Valdosta State University which is in his hometown.

Professional career
Reid signed with the St. Louis Rams on March 24, 2014. This was two days after the Rams held a private workout for him. He was waived during final cuts on August 30, 2014.

He was assigned to the New Orleans VooDoo on December 23, 2014.

Reid participated in the first inaugural NFL Veteran Combine on March 22, 2015.

On April 29, 2015, Reid was assigned to the Jacksonville Sharks. Reid's play led to him being named to the First-team All-Arena squad; he was also the AFL Rookie of the Year.

On May 30, 2017, Reid was assigned to the Tampa Bay Storm. He was placed on league suspension on June 8, 2017.

Reid signed with the Monterrey Steel for their postseason run.

On May 22, 2018, Reid was assigned to the Washington Valor.

His first full season with the Montreal Alouettes was 2019. Reid had 71 defensive tackles, knocked down 10 passes, made 3 interceptions, forced a fumble and recovered one. He was an integral member of the secondary on a resurgent Alouettes team and was named one of the 2019 CFL All-Stars.
 He signed a contract extension with the team on December 18, 2020.

References

External links
 Player profile at Seminoles.com

1990 births
Living people
Under Armour All-American football players
American football cornerbacks
American football return specialists
Florida State Seminoles football players
St. Louis Rams players
New Orleans VooDoo players
People from Valdosta, Georgia
Players of American football from Georgia (U.S. state)
Jacksonville Sharks players
Tampa Bay Storm players
Monterrey Steel players
Washington Valor players
Montreal Alouettes players